The Battle for Australia is a contested historiographical term used to claim a coordinated link between a series of battles near Australia during the Pacific War of the Second World War alleged to be in preparation for a Japanese invasion of the continent.

Historiography and commemoration
The Returned and Services League of Australia (RSL) and the Battle for Australia Commemoration National Council campaigned for over a decade for official commemoration of a series of battles fought in 1942, including the Battle of the Coral Sea, Battle of Milne Bay and Kokoda Track campaign, as having formed a "battle for Australia". This campaign met with success, and in 2008 the Australian Government proclaimed that commemorations for the Battle for Australia would take place annually on the first Wednesday in September, with the day being designated "Battle for Australia Day". This day recognizes "the service and sacrifice of all those who served in defense of Australia in 1942 and 1943". The day is not a public holiday.

Peter Stanley, the former principal historian at the Australian War Memorial, argues that the concept of a 'Battle for Australia' is mistaken as these actions did not form a single campaign aimed against Australia. Stanley has also stated that no historian he knows believes that there was a 'Battle for Australia'. In a 2006 speech, Stanley argued that the concept of a Battle for Australia is invalid as the events that are considered to form the battle were only loosely related. Stanley argued, "The Battle for Australia movement arises directly out of a desire to find meaning in the terrible losses of 1942" and that "there was no 'Battle for Australia', as such", as the Japanese did not launch a coordinated campaign directed against Australia. Furthermore, Stanley stated that while the phrase "Battle for Australia" was used in wartime propaganda, it was not applied to the events of 1942 until the 1990s and that countries other than Australia do not recognize the "battle" as being part of the Second World War.

See also
Military history of Australia during World War II
Operation FS
Proposed Japanese invasion of Australia during World War II

Notes

References
Peter Stanley (2002). He's (Not) Coming South: The Invasion That Wasn't. Paper delivered to the Australian War Memorial conference Remembering 1942.

Further reading

External links
Battle for Australia Association
Australian War Memorial "Australia Under Attack 1942–1943"
anzacday.org.au "Battle for Australia"

Conflicts in 1942
Conflicts in 1943
Australia
1942 in Australia
Australia
Military attacks against Australia